Global Spectrum may refer to:

 Comcast Spectacor#Global Spectrum
 Spectrum of a ring#Global Spec